Median may refer to:

Mathematics and statistics
 Median (statistics), in statistics, a number that separates the lowest- and highest-value halves
 Median (geometry), in geometry, a line joining a vertex of a triangle to the midpoint of the opposite side
Median (graph theory), a vertex m(a,b,c) that belongs to shortest paths between each pair of a, b, and c
 Median algebra, an algebraic triple product generalising the algebraic properties of the majority function
 Median graph, undirected graph in which every three vertices a, b, and c have a unique median
 Geometric median, a point minimizing the sum of distances to a given set of points

People
 Median (rapper), a rapper from the U.S. city of Raleigh, North Carolina

Science and technology
 Median (biology), an anatomical term of location, meaning at or towards the central plane of a bilaterally symmetrical organism or structure
 Median filter, a nonlinear digital filtering technique used to reduce noise in images
 Median nerve, a nerve in humans and other animals located in the upper limb, one of the five main nerves originating from the brachial plexus

Other
 Median language, the extinct Northwestern Iranian language of the Medes people
 Median Empire or Median Kingdom, an ancient Iranian empire predating the First Persian Empire
 Median consonant, a consonant sound that is produced when air flows across the center of the mouth over the tongue
 Median strip, the portion of a divided roadway used to separate opposing traffic; the British equivalent is central reservation
 Median triangle, an archaeological term referring to the area bounded by Hamadān, Malāyer and Kangāvar in Iran

See also
 Medes, an ancient Iranian people who originated in Media, in the northwest of present-day Iran
 Mediant, in music, the note halfway between the tonic and the dominant
 Mediant (mathematics), a fraction created from the sums of the numerators and denominators of two other fractions
 Medial (disambiguation)
 Medium (disambiguation)